Chilades parrhasius, the small Cupid, is a small butterfly that belongs to the lycaenids or blues family. It is found in Nepal, southern Turan, southern Ghissar, Iran, Afghanistan, Pakistan, Sri Lanka and southern, central and north-west India.

Description

Subspecies
Chilades parrhasius parrhasius (India)
Chilades parrhasius nila Evans, 1925 (Sri Lanka)
Chilades parrhasius minuta (Evans, 1932) (Pakistan)

See also
List of butterflies of India
List of butterflies of India (Lycaenidae)

References

Sources
 
 
 
 
 
 

Chilades
Butterflies of Asia
Butterflies described in 1793